The Glascock Poetry Prize is awarded to the winner of the invitation only Kathryn Irene Glascock Intercollegiate Poetry Contest at Mount Holyoke College.

1993 - present 

2022 (99th):

 Winner: Clare O'Gara from Smith College
 Kate Blakley from University of New Hampshire
 Liza Marsala from Massachusetts College of Liberal Arts
 Jocelyn Maeyama from Wesleyan University
 Imani Ross from Howard University
 Darwin Michener-Rutledge from Mount Holyoke College

2021 (98th):
Winner: Tovah Strong from Institute of American Indian Arts
Alejandra Cabezas from Mount Holyoke College
Julia Kudler from University of Washington at Seattle
Meredith Luchs from Hampshire College
Felicia Payomo from Mills College
Wafa Shaikh from Houston Community College

2020 (97th):
Winner: Marissa Perez from Holyoke Community College
2nd Place: Luciana Arbus-Scandiffio from Bennington College
Natalie Bavar from University of Massachusetts Amherst
American Xavier Gaylord from College of the Holy Cross
Maren McKenna from Mount Holyoke College
Samiha Swarup from University of Toronto

2019 (96th):
Winner: Dur-e-Maknoon Ahmed from Mount Holyoke College
Winner: Sarah Terrazano from Brandeis University
Vilhelm (Billy) Anderson Woltz from Massachusetts Institute of Technology
Ariana Benson from Spelman College
Julia Falkner from Smith College
John Krug from The New School

2018 (95th):
Winner: Linda Zhang from Mount Holyoke College
Michelle Chen from University of Massachusetts Amherst
Jordan Jace from Williams College
Noelle Powers from University of Tennessee at Chattanooga
Kyra Spence from Barnard College
Grayson Wolf from Hunter College

2017 (94th):
Winner: Anisha Pai from Mount Holyoke College
2nd Place: Natalia Rodriquez from City College of New York 
Kwamesha Joseph from Fordham University
Emily Robidoux from Smith College
Malini Ghandi from Yale University

2016 (93rd):
Winner: Zoë Bodzas from Hamilton College 
2nd Place: Peter LaBerge from University of Pennsylvania
Angela Nelson from University of Rhode Island
James O'Connell from Emerson College
Rachel Schmieder-Gropen from Mount Holyoke College
Nina Shallman from Amherst College

2015 (92nd):
 Winners: Nisha Jain from Cornell University and Julian Parikh from Boston University
 2nd place: Taylor Marks from Smith College
 Katherine Gibbel from Wesleyan University
 Emma Ginader from Mount Holyoke College
 Rose Laurano from Rutgers University

2014 (91st):
Winner: Rebecca Liu from Columbia University 
2nd place: Milo Muise from Hampshire College
Ryan Kim from Middlebury College
Anthea Hubanks from Mount Holyoke College
Robert Allen Parry from University of Southern Maine
Elizabeth Rowland from Vassar College

2013 (90th):
Winner: Jamie Samdahl from Smith College 
2nd place: Laura Naparstek from Skidmore College 
Lauren Abbate from Mount Holyoke College 
Salma Elmehdawi from Fordham University
Paige Melin from University at Buffalo
Warner James Wood from Harvard University

2012 (89th):
Winner: Garon Scott from University of Connecticut
2nd place: Katherine Kinkel from Bowdoin College
Layli Amerson from Mount Holyoke College
Andrew Bustria from Sarah Lawrence College
Brian Folan from University of Massachusetts, Amherst
Jessica Yoo from Johns Hopkins University

2011 (88th):
Winner: Kit Schluter from Bard College
2nd place: Melissa Yang from Mount Holyoke College
Frances Cannon from University of Vermont
Emily A. Lee from Trinity College
Christopher Spaide from Amherst College
April Walker from Emory University

2010 (87th):
Winner: Nicole Gervasio from Bryn Mawr College
2nd place: Naomi Sosner from Dartmouth College and Nisa Williams from University of Maryland
Caroline Georges from Hampshire College
Anya Johnson from Syracuse University
Bianca Young from Mount Holyoke College

2009 (86th):
Winner: Emily Yates from Mount Holyoke College
2nd Place: Georgia Pearle from Smith College
Miriam Callahan from American University
Sarah Brenner from Bennington College
Kelly Forsythe from University of Pittsburgh
Elisa Gonzalez from Yale University

2008 (85th):
Winner: Alexandra Zelman-Döring from Brown University
2nd place: Sarah Binns from Mount Holyoke College
Laura Burns from Bates College
Dan Esposito from Boston College
William Hough from University of Massachusetts Amherst
Tina Ganguly from Stony Brook University

2007 (84th):
Winners: Sarah Twombly from Mount Holyoke College and Emma Gorenberg from Amherst College 
Deborah Beth Medows from Brandeis University
Mark Parlette from College of William & Mary
Philip Matthews from Temple University
Noel Tague from University of New Hampshire

2006 (83rd):
Winner: Jessica Spradling from Dartmouth College 
2nd Place: Sarah Giragosian from Mount Holyoke College
Ashley Williard from Hampshire College
Rachael Hudak from the University of Michigan
Sam Donsky from the University of Pennsylvania
Kate Broad from Wellesley College

2005 (82nd):
 Winner: Carolyn Creedon from Smith College
 Nancy Doherty from Mount Holyoke College 	
 Dan Joseph from Boston University
 Alan King from Howard University
 Ian Segal from Princeton University
 Anna Torres from Swarthmore College

2004 (81st):
Winners: Davey Volner from Columbia University and Kristina Martino from UMass Amherst
 Rachel Kahn from Mount Holyoke College
 Ariele le Grand from Spelman College
 Heather Maki from Williams College
 Sokunthary Svay from the City College of New York

2003 (80th):
Winner: Rachel Gainer from George Washington University 
 2nd Place: Billy Lopez from Amherst College
 Geoffrey C. Babbitt from Connecticut College
 Olivia Bustion from Mount Holyoke College
 Arnold Seong from Cornell University
 David Willis from Haverford College

2002 (79th):
 Winner: Keayr Braxton from Vassar College
 2nd place: Katharine Sapper from Mount Holyoke College
 Susan Ellsworth from Colby College
 Justine Post from Hampshire College
 Sumitra Ratneshwar from University of Connecticut
 Daniel Sack from Brandeis University

2001 (78th):
 Winner: Emma Christensen from Bryn Mawr College
 2nd place: Meghan Tally from Emory University
 Erica Dawson from Johns Hopkins University
 Kathryn Foran from Mount Holyoke College
 Joshua Friedman from Amherst College
 Kimberley Rogers from Smith College

2000 (77th):
 Winner: Anna Ziegler from Yale University
 2nd Place: Diane Rainson from Mount Holyoke College
 Roseanne (Rosebud) Lane from New York University
 Chris Martin from Carleton College
 Alicia Potee from Saint John's College
 Elizabeth Werner from Hampshire College

1999 (76th):
 Winner: Erika W. Dyson from Mount Holyoke College
 2nd place: Elspeth Healey from Brown University
 David Jones from George Washington University
 Lily Roberts from Skidmore College
 Elysabeth (Abe Louise) Young from Smith College
 Anthony Brandt Zipp from Johns Hopkins University
1998 (75th):
 Winner: Deirdre Lockwood from Amherst College 
 2nd place: Joshua Carter from Bard College 
 Alicia Rabins from Barnard College 
 Katie Sigelman from Harvard University 
 Yasotha Sriharan from Mount Holyoke College
 Amanda Williams from University of North Carolina
1997 (74th):
 Winners: Stephanie Saldana from Middlebury College and Amy Thomas from Dartmouth College
 Tamar Stratyevskaya from Mount Holyoke College
 Nuy Y. Cho from Barnard College
 Tyler Maas from Hampshire College
 Sara Perry from Massachusetts Institute of Technology

1996 (73rd):
 Winner: Christine Bauch from Vassar College 
 2nd Place: Michael Donohue from Princeton University 
 Sam Cherubin from University of Massachusetts 
 Andrea Deese from Swarthmore College 
 Jared Hickman from Bowdoin College 
   Judi Ward from Mount Holyoke College

1995 (72nd):
 Winner: Jardine Libaire from Skidmore College
 2nd place: Bess Huddle from Middlebury College
  3rd place: Jennifer Lowe from Mount Holyoke College
  Andrea Brady from Columbia University
  Megan Gilbert from Boston University
  Victoria Pearson from Smith College

1994 (71st):
 Winner: Rebecca Horwitt from Tufts University
  2nd place: Vikki Merton from Mount Holyoke College
  3rd place: Jessica Harris from Pennsylvania State University
  Rachel Jones from Williams College
  Josephine Park from Amherst College
  Mika Shino from New York University

1993  (70th)
 Winner: Oliver Jones from Hampshire College
 2nd place: Brooke Belcher from Bates College and Melanie Rehak from University of Pennsylvania
  Vikki Merton from Mount Holyoke College
  C.B. Bernard from Saint Michael's College
  Margaret M. Nelson (Maggie Nelson) from Wesleyan

Past winners and participants 
1992:
 Winner: Gia Hansbury from Bryn Mawr College
 2nd place: Jennifer Wilder from Yale University
 Garrett Doherty from University of Massachusetts
 Amy Glynn from Mount Holyoke College
 Maximillian Heinegg from Union College
 Alonzo Patterson from Lincoln University
1991:
 Winner: Mara Scanlon from University of Virginia
 2nd place: Norma Laurenzi from Wellesley College
 Robert Bradley from Stony Brook University
 Ken Cormier from University of Connecticut
 Nancy L. Richard from Mount Holyoke College
 Janet Walker from Boston College
1990:
 Winner: Steven Johnson from Brown University
 2nd place: Maria Elena Robb from Cornell University
 Kerry Sarnoski from Smith College
 Jennifer Hollingsworth from Hollins University
 Gerard LaFemina from Sarah Lawrence College
 Michelle Lodjic from Mount Holyoke College
1989:
 Winner: Chris McEntee from St. Michael's College
 2nd place: Richard Hatchett from Vanderbilt University
 Jennifer Call from Harvard University
 William Fisher from Amherst College
 Alex Sela from University at Albany, SUNY
 Anna Sibley from Mount Holyoke College
1988:
 Winner: Larissa Szporluk from University of Michigan
 2nd place: Bruce Baker from Skidmore College
 Rosemary Gould from Dartmouth College
 Andrea Werblin from University of Massachusetts
 Beth Cross from Saint John's College
 Julia Watson from Mount Holyoke College
1987:
 Winner: Whedbee Mullen from Princeton University
 2nd place: Jerry Smith from Hampshire College
 Greg Wilson from Emory University
 Mike Wood from University of Rhode Island
 Eric Arehart from Bennington College
 Anna Sibley from Mount Holyoke College
1986:
 Winners: Ralph Savarese from Wesleyan University and Nancy Burns from Vassar College
 Sean Reardon from University of Notre Dame
 Susan Bartfay from Greenfield Community College
 Louise A. Wareham from Columbia University
 Elizabeth Palermo from Mount Holyoke College
1985:
 Winner: Susan Lasher from Yale University
 2nd place: Margaret L. Anderson from Mount Holyoke College
 Bruce Hainley from College of William & Mary
 Ruth Maus from Smith College
 J.D. Smith from American University
 Jonathan Wahl from Boston University
1984:
 Winner: Ellen Spring from University of Vermont
 2nd place: Nina Solomon from Barnard College
 3rd place: Fernando Hernandez from Brooklyn College
 Darrell Donnell Darrisaw from Morris Brown College
 David Matson from Bates College
 Betty Ellen Walter from Mount Holyoke College
1983:
 Winners: Michele McMahon from New York University and Anna Peterson from Williams College
 Anne Myles from Bryn Mawr College
 Alice Sebold from Syracuse University
 Theresa M. Yuhas from Mount Holyoke College
1982:
 Winner: Terry Hayes from Brooklyn College
 2nd place: Robert Lord Keyes from University of Massachusetts and Mark Labdon from Colby College
 Marc Cote from McGill University
 Glenn Pearl from Union College
 Valerie Tratnyek from Mount Holyoke College
1981:
 Winner: Amy Boesky from Harvard University
 2nd place: Elizabeth A. Cole from Swarthmore College
 Helen Bartlett from Trinity College
 Monique V. Chireau from Mount Holyoke College
 Jeffrey Kennell from University at Albany, SUNY
 Meredith Randall from Amherst College
1980:
 Winner: Ginny Eliason from University of New Hampshire
 2nd place: Lynn Behrendt from Bard College and Emily S. Silverman from Mount Holyoke College
 Judith Bloch from Hunter College
 Hugh Blumenfeld from Massachusetts Institute of Technology
 Pindie Stephen from Cornell University
1979:
 Winner: Ellen Gray from University of Connecticut
 2nd place: Lisa Hagen from Sweet Briar College and Patricia Rettew from Wellesley College
 Wayne Burke from Goddard College
 Thor Ronay from Boston College
 Catherine E. Whitehead from Mount Holyoke College
1978:
 Winner: Katherine Jane Gill from Mount Holyoke College
 2nd place: James Clark from Boston University
 Lynn Bershak from Douglass College
 Tom Callaghan from Vassar College
 Nancy Chatfield from Smith College
 Jeremiah Cronin from Connecticut College
1977:
 Winner: Alfred Nicol from Dartmouth College
 Jennifer Arndt from Princeton University
 Steven Gutherz from Tufts University
 Janice L. Kelemen from Mount Holyoke College
 Kate Llewellyn from University of Pennsylvania
 Steven White from Williams College
1976:
 Winner: Devon Miller from Mount Holyoke College
 2nd place: Mary Jo Salter from Radcliffe College - Harvard University  and Scott Haas from Hampshire College
 Michael Gizzi from Brown University
 John Latta from Cornell University
 Cynthia Medalie from Sarah Lawrence College

1975:
 Winner: Russell Sehnert from Colby College
 2nd place: Dean Holmes from Wesleyan University and Robert Lloyd from University of New Hampshire
 Linda J. Corrente from Mount Holyoke College
 George-Therese Dickenson from Wellesley College
 Kathy Sue Orr from Sweet Briar College

1974:
 Winner: Gjertrud Schnackenberg from Mount Holyoke College
 Robert Cava from Massachusetts Institute of Technology
 Rika Lesser from Yale University
 Kathleen Sawyer from University of Massachusetts
 William Vassilopoulos from Manchester Community College
 Ellen Weinberg from Goucher College
1973:
 Winner: Gjertrud Schnackenberg from Mount Holyoke College
 2nd place: Ann Peterson from Smith College and Roberta Alan Rosenberg from Harvard University
 Paul G. Grimes from Yale University
 Nini McCabe from Bennington College
 Thomas Skove Jr. from Amherst College
1972:
 Winner: Frances Padorr from Barnard College
 2nd place: David Cloutier from Brown University
 Roger Conover from Bowdoin College
 Lynn Christiane Jacox from Mount Holyoke College
 Muffy Seigel from Swarthmore College
 Gretchen Wolff from Bryn Mawr College
1971:
 Winner: James Richardson from Princeton University
 2nd place: Lynn Christiane Jacox from Mount Holyoke College
 Susanne K. Fickert from Smith College
 Allen Foresta from Cornell University
 Mark Fowler from Brandeis University
 Timothy Sammons from Massachusetts Institute of Technology
1970:
 Winners: Cassia Berman from Sarah Lawrence College and Katha Pollitt from Radcliffe College
 Harry Allan George from Bowdoin College
 John J. Heagney from Lock Haven University of Pennsylvania
 Peter M. Kaldheim from Dartmouth College
 Eloise F. White from Mount Holyoke College
1969:
 Winner: Bruce Dvorchik from University of Connecticut
 2nd place: David Lehman from Columbia University and Kathleen Anne Norris from Bennington College
 Ellen Anthony from Vassar College
 Ann Schulte from Mount Holyoke College
 Jeffrey Wohkittel from Wesleyan University
1968:
 Winner: Barry Seiler from Queens College
 2nd place: Maeve Kinkead from Radcliffe College and James L. Price from Dartmouth College
 David A. Lupher from Yale University
 Patricia Ann Roth from Mount Holyoke College
 Lillie Kate Walker from Spelman College
1967:
 Winner: John Koethe from Princeton University
 2nd place: David J. Shapiro from Columbia University
 Joan Dimow from Connecticut College
 Cheryl Ann Lawson from Wellesley College
 William Mullen from Harvard University
 Ann Schulte from Mount Holyoke College
1966:
 Winner: Michael B. Wolfe from Wesleyan University
 2nd place: Ellin Sarot from Barnard College and Thomas Walsh from Yale University
 David Glass from Tufts University
 Sheryl A. Owens from Mount Holyoke College
 Tom Parson from Yale University
 Elisabeth Young from Sarah Lawrence College
1965:
 Winner: Roberta Elzey from Bennington College
 2nd place: Anne D. Cleaves from Mount Holyoke College and Margaret Edwards from Bryn Mawr College
 David Beckman from Brown University
 Richard Deutch from Bard College
 Gerald Meyers from Harvard University
1964:
 Winner: Mary Ann Radner from Wellesley College
 Patricia Arnold from Connecticut College
 Martha W. George from Mount Holyoke College
 William Hunt from Wesleyan University
 Edward Kissam from Princeton University
 Steven Orlen from University of Massachusetts
1963:
 Winner: Alarik W. Skarstrom from Tufts University
 2nd place: Helen Pringle from Mount Holyoke College
 Steven Ablon from Amherst College
 Mary Lynn Davis from Vassar College
 Sam K. Davis from Wesleyan University
 Mary-Kay Gamel from Smith College
 Gerard Malanga from Wagner College
1962:
 Winner: Ellen Y. Sutherland from Mount Holyoke College
 2nd place: Laura Kirchman from Sarah Lawrence College
 Edward B. Freeman from Yale University
 Judith Gerber from Barnard College
 R. Edwin Jarman from Williams College
 David Lander from Trinity College
1961:
 Winner: Margaret Hambrecht from Wellesley College
 2nd place: Norman D. D’Arthenay from Wesleyan University
 John C. Holden from Harvard University
 Jacqueline Klein from Bennington College
 Barbara L. Morgan from Mount Holyoke College
 Bruce Wilder from Tufts University
1960:
 Winner: Mark W. Halperin from Bard College
 2nd place: Miriam M. Reik from Sarah Lawrence College
 Charles J. Doria from Western Reserve
 John Harbison from Harvard University
 Sandra M. Iger from Mount Holyoke College
 Alexander Lattimore from Dartmouth College
 Iris Tillman from Smith College
1959:
 Winner: G. Jon Roush from Amherst College
 Carole Battista from Connecticut College
 Katherine Greene from Vassar College
 Alfred M. Lee from Yale University
 Peter Livingston from Tufts University
 Augustus Y. Napier from Wesleyan University
 Moira E. Thompson from Mount Holyoke College
1958:
 Winner: Janet Burroway from Barnard College
 2nd place: Michael M. Fried from Princeton University
 Jill Hoffman from Bennington College
 Peter Livingston from Tufts University
 Lynne S. Mayo from Mount Holyoke College
 Peter Parsons from Yale University
 Remington Rose from Trinity College
1957
Winner: Robert Ely Bagg from Amherst College
2nd place: Michael M. Fried from Princeton University
Terry Brook from Sarah Lawrence College
Constance Horton from Bryn Mawr College
Lynne Lawner from Wellesley College
F.L. Seidel from Harvard University
1956:
 Winner: Harold James Wilson from Williams College
 2nd place: Helen M. O’Brien from Mount Holyoke College
 Weir Burke from Connecticut College
 Jan Donald Curran from University of Vermont
 Lorna Regolsky from University of Massachusetts
 David R. Slavitt from Yale University
1955:
 Winners: Sylvia Plath from Smith College and William Key Whitman from Wesleyan University
 Lynne Lawner from Wellesley College
 Donald Lehmkuhl from Columbia University
 Jean Ann Piser from Mount Holyoke College
 David Rattray from Dartmouth College
1954:
 Winner: Margaret Tongue from Vassar College
 Jerome A. Barron from Tufts University
 Dorothy E. Fuller from Mount Holyoke College
 Pete Goldman from Williams College
 Walter Kaiser from Harvard University
 William Velton from Amherst College
1953:
 Winner: Richard C. Sewell from Bard College
 David N. Keightley from Amherst College
 Pauline Miller Leet from Boston University
 Mary Anne Muller from Mount Holyoke College
 Marnie Pomeroy from Sarah Lawrence College
 J. N. Smith from Haverford College
1952:
 Winner: George Garrett from Princeton University
 Jack Brownfield from Hamilton College
 Ann Hyde from Wheaton College
 George A. Kelly from Harvard University
 William McGrath from University of Massachusetts
 Mary Anne Muller from Mount Holyoke College
1951:
 Winner: Robert Colleen from Tufts University
 2nd place: Donald Hall from Harvard University
 Robert LaGuardia from Columbia University
 Lora S. Levy from Brandeis University
 Alexandra Tschacbasoff from Bennington College
 E. Jane Williams from Mount Holyoke College

1950:
 Winner: Edward Collins Bogardus from Yale University
 Janet A. Emig from Mount Holyoke College
 Maureen Kearns from Smith College
 Roger Simmons from Dartmouth College
 Raymond Smith from Williams College
 Linda Weinberg from Vassar College
1949:
 Winner: William Burford from Amherst College
 Marianne Halley from Wellesley College
 Sidney Michaels from Tufts University
 Louis Edward Sissman from Harvard University
 Peggy Talbott from Sarah Lawrence College
 Evelyn M. West from Mount Holyoke College
1948:
 Winner: Kenneth Koch from Harvard University and Sidney Michaels from Tufts University
 Diana Chang from Barnard College
 George William Green from College of the Holy Cross
 Marion Elizabeth Orr from Wellesley College
 Rosamond Rauch from Mount Holyoke College

1947:
 Winner: Frederick Buechner from Princeton University
 2nd place: Phoebe Pierce from Bennington College
 Arline Appelbaum from Swarthmore College
 Jane Armstrong from Mount Holyoke College
 Charles Burkhart from Cornell University
 Judith Nelson from Radcliffe College
 Laurence Silberstein from Dartmouth College

1946:
 Winner: James Merrill from Amherst College
 2nd place: Miriam H. Truesdell from Mount Holyoke College
 M. David Bell from Brown University
 William Robert Fague from Wesleyan University
 S.A. Lieber from Williams College
 Roger Shattuck from Yale University
 Medeline Sherman from Smith College
 Sylvia Stallings from Bryn Mawr College
1945:
 Winner: John Senior from Columbia University
 Lucy Grey Black from Wheaton College
 William Robert Fague from Wesleyan University
 Reuben Hersh from Harvard University
 Alice Johnson from Boston University
 Mary McCullough from Mount Holyoke College
1944:
 Winner: John Vournakes from Tufts University
 Elizabeth E. Converse from Mount Holyoke College
 Edward Kuhn from Dartmouth College
 Ralph Nash from Duke University
 Jacqueline Steiner from Vassar College
 Selden Thomas from Middlebury College
 Ruth Whitman from Radcliffe College
1943:
 Winner: Sven Magnus Armens from Tufts University
 Elysabeth Barbour from Sarah Lawrence College
 William Francis from Amherst College
 Anthony Evan Hecht from Bard College
 Marion J. Kingston from Mount Holyoke College
 William Manchester from University of Massachusetts
1942:
 Winner: William Sellers from Boston University
 Thomas Barbour from Princeton University
 Josephine L. Doughton from Mount Holyoke College
 George McDonough from Middlebury College
 Blythe Morley from Vassar College
1941:
 Winner: Cedric Whitman from Harvard University
 Carl Carlson from Wesleyan University
 Cynthia Coggan from Smith College
 William Kunstler from Yale University
 Lois E. Neupert from Mount Holyoke College
 Jean Nevius from Wheaton College
1940:
 Winner: George Zabriskie from Duke University
 Frank Donaldson Brown from Williams College
 Edward McDonel Fritz from Dartmouth College
 Anne Grosvenor from Vassar College
 Maxine West from Pennsylvania State University
 Anne L. Wonders from Mount Holyoke College
1939:
 Winners: Elinor J. Bowker from Mount Holyoke College and Howard Houston from Cornell University
 John Chamberlain from Princeton University
 Clara Cohen from Wellesley College
 Frances Power from Radcliffe College
 Harry Rosenstein from Columbia University
1938:
 Winner: Eleanor Ruggles from Vassar College
 Edwin Burrows from Yale University
 Edith Conklin from Bennington College
 Robert T. S. Lowell from Kenyon College
 Samuel French Morse from Harvard University
 Eleanor M. Withington from Mount Holyoke College
1937:
 Winner: Sara L. Allen from Mount Holyoke College
 2nd place: Reba Jane Miller from Smith College
 Shirley Alberta Bliss from University of Massachusetts
 James H. Green from Amherst College
 M.F. Wolfe from Williams College
1936:
 Winners: Sara L. Allen from Mount Holyoke College and Robert Cushman from Wesleyan University
 Charles Foster from Amherst College
 Samuel French Morse from Dartmouth College
 Margaret Potter from Smith College
1935:
 Winner: Mary Prescott Rice from Bennington College
 2nd place: Florence Dunbar from Mount Holyoke College
 Keith Huntress from Wesleyan University
 Francis Whitefield from Harvard University
1934:
 Winner: Louise S. Porter from Mount Holyoke College
 2nd place: Philip Horton from Princeton University
 Thomas John Carlisle from Williams College
 Gertrude V.V. Franchot from Bryn Mawr College
 J. Edward Grubb from Wesleyan University
1933:
 Winner: M. Virginia Hamilton from Mount Holyoke College
 William Kimball Flaccus from Dartmouth College
 Robert Alan Green from Amherst College
 Israel Smith from Middlebury College
 Constance Walther from Smith College
 Adelaide Weinstock from Wheaton College
1932:
 Winner: M. Virginia Hamilton from Mount Holyoke College
 James Agee from Harvard University
 John Finch from Wesleyan University
 Townsend Miller from Yale University
 Muriel Rukeyser from Vassar College
 Lawrence Stapleton from Smith College
 A.P. Sweet from Princeton University
1931:
 Winner: William Kimball Flaccus from Dartmouth College
 2nd place: M. Virginia Hamilton from Mount Holyoke College
 Elizabeth Massie from Middlebury College
 Hugo Saglio from Amherst College
 Carl Rodney Shom from University of New Hampshire
 Ruth H. Dodge from University of New Hampshire
1930:
 Winner: Winfield Townley Scott from Brown University
 Sarah-Elizabeth Roger from Barnard College
 Peter Yates from Princeton University
 Anita Young from Mount Holyoke College
 Mary Blodgett from Radcliffe College
 Richard Ely Morse from Amherst College

1929 (only year held at Wesleyan University):
 Winner: John F. Swain from Wesleyan University
 Frances Strunsky from Vassar College
 Edward Scribner Cobb from Amherst College
 Constance Klugh from Mount Holyoke College
 Edgar Williams Larkin from Williams College

1928:
Winner: Tom Prideaux from Yale University
 Doris Clark from Mount Holyoke College
 Anne Lundgren from Connecticut College
 John F. Swain from Wesleyan University

1927:
 Winner: Martha Hodgson from Mount Holyoke College
 Jane Boone from Vassar College
 Margaret Haley from  Bryn Mawr College 
 Lucia Jordan from Smith
 Judith Stern from Wellesley College

1926:
 Winner: Josephine Garwood from Barnard College 
 John Holmes from Tufts University
 Edith Horton from Cornell University
 Judith Stern Wellesley College
 George Cassidy from Brown University
 Elizabeth Whitney from Mount Holyoke College
 Henry Zolinsky from College of the City of New York

1925:
 Winner: Roberta Teale Swartz from Mount Holyoke College
 John Abbott from Harvard
 Curtis Canfield from Amherst
 Barbara Ling from Bryn Mawr College (Honorable Mention)
 Judith Stern from Wellesley College

1924:
 Winner: Roberta Teale Swartz from Mount Holyoke College 
 William Troy from Yale University
 Martha E. Keller from Vassar College
1923:
 Winner: Anita Elizabeth Don from Mount Holyoke College
 Julia C. Abbe from Mount Holyoke College
 Katharine Lee from Mount Holyoke College
 Kathleen S. Moore from Mount Holyoke College
 Roberta Teale Swartz from Mount Holyoke College
 Rezia Rowley from Mount Holyoke College
 Elizabeth Whitney from Mount Holyoke College

See also
List of poetry awards
Poetry prizes

Notes

External links
Glascock Poetry Contest

Lists of writers
Lists of award winners
American poetry awards